Shul (also Romanized as Shūl and Shool) is a village in Hayat Davud Rural District, in the Central District of Ganaveh County, Bushehr Province, Iran. At the 2006 census, its population was 1,225, in 268 families.

References 

Populated places in Ganaveh County